Losh is a surname. Notable people with the surname include:

 Barbi Losh (born 1963), American model and actress, Miss Florida USA 1985
 Elizabeth Losh, American media theorist
 James Losh (1763–1833),  English lawyer, reformer and unitarian
 Sarah or Sara Losh (1785–1853), English architect and designer
 William Losh (1770–1861), English chemist and industrialist credited with introducing the Leblanc process

LoSH also stands for:
 Legion of Super-Heroes